Wallpaq Sillu Punta (Quechua wallpa hen, -q an obsolete suffix, sillu claw, punta peak; ridge, "chicken claw peak (or ridge)", also spelled Huallpacsillopunta) is a mountain in the Cordillera Negra in the Andes of Peru which reaches a height of approximately . It is located in the Ancash Region, Yungay Province, on the border of the districts of Cascapara and Quillo.

References

Mountains of Peru
Mountains of Ancash Region